Red Temple Spirits were an American post-punk band from Los Angeles, California, formed in 1987.

History 
Forming in 1987, the group's original lineup consisted of vocalist William Faircloth, guitarist Dallas Taylor, bass guitarist Dino Paredes and drummer Thomas Pierik. Faircloth, an immigrant from England, had previously sung for trio Ministry of Love, who released the Wide Awake and Dreaming EP in 1987 on the label Underworld. Paredes had previously played with Kelly Wheeler of Psi Com. Pierik and Taylor had earlier been members of the Web, along with bassist Johann Schumann (later of Christian Death).

Red Temple Spirits' name was inspired by the song "Two Headed Dog (Red Temple Prayer)" by Roky Erickson, whom they admired. Other influences ranged from post-punk bands such as the Cure and Savage Republic to psychedelic artists like Pink Floyd (they covered "The Nile Song" and "Set the Controls for the Heart of the Sun" on their releases), melded with Native American and Tibetan mysticism.

Red Temple Spirits released two albums on the Nate Starkman & Son label, distributed by Fundamental Records: double-LP set Dancing to Restore an Eclipsed Moon (1988) and If Tomorrow I Were Leaving for Lhasa, I Wouldn't Stay a Minute More... (1989).

Their sole single, an elaborately packaged release (a limited-edition, numbered edition of 1,200 copies) on Independent Project Records to benefit Tibet House, featured A-side "New Land" (recorded in 1987 as part of the band's first demo) and B-side "Exodus from Lhasa" (recorded in 1989).

Red Temple Spirits began to garner more attention in late 1989 after a promo video for "City of Millions" was shown on MTV's 120 Minutes and they performed at the 1989 CMJ Music Marathon in New York City. With new drummer Scott McPherson, the band toured the United States in early 1990 to promote If Tomorrow I Were Leaving for Lhasa, garnering significant press and a devoted cult fanbase, but lapsed into inactivity later that year following a serious van accident in California. They disbanded in 1992, with Faircloth and Taylor relocating to Sedona, Arizona.

Paredes, who had worked as an art director for music labels Triple X, Priority and Chameleon, later became vice president of A&R for Rick Rubin's American Recordings, where he signed System of a Down and Wesley Willis among others.

While in Sedona, Faircloth (a printer for Independent Project Press) and Taylor recorded a cassette-only album, The Alien Host, under the name Invisible Opera Company of Tibet. It was released in 1996 by Parasol Records. The pair briefly revived the name Red Temple Spirits in 1998, but did not release any new material. Alex Koffler (great-nephew of Kurt Weill and later the musician behind the projects the Beauty Above and Blackswan) played keyboards in this lineup.

After nearly a decade of dormancy, Faircloth, Taylor and Pierik discussed a reformation in 2007, but plans to record a third album did not come to fruition and the band remained inactive.

Independent Project Records remastered the first two albums and reissued them as a limited-edition two-disc box set in 2013, with three bonus tracks: both sides of the "New Land" 7" and a previously unreleased remake of "New Land". The first
300 copies in IPR's numbered edition also included a bonus third disc featuring four remastered tracks from the band's 1987 demo.

Discography

Studio albums
Dancing to Restore an Eclipsed Moon (1988, Nate Starkman & Son/Fundamental)
If Tomorrow I Were Leaving for Lhasa, I Wouldn't Stay a Minute More... (1989, Nate Starkman & Son/Fundamental)

Singles
"New Land"/"Exodus from Lhasa" 7" (1989, Independent Project Records)

Compilation albums
Red Temple Spirits box set (2013, Independent Project Records)

Recording as Invisible Opera Company of Tibet
The Alien Host cassette (1996, Parasol Records

References

External links 

 

American post-punk music groups
American art rock groups
American experimental rock groups
Musical groups disestablished in 1992
Musical groups established in 1987
Musical groups from Los Angeles
Musical groups reestablished in 2007
Musical quartets
Psychedelic rock music groups from California